Parfyonovskaya Vystavka is a rural locality (a village) in Parfyonovskoye Rural Settlement, Velikoustyugsky District, Vologda Oblast, Russia. The population was 3 as of 2002.

Geography 
Parfyonovskaya Vystavka is located 22 km south of Veliky Ustyug (the district's administrative centre) by road. Kuzminskaya Vystavka is the nearest rural locality.

References 

Rural localities in Velikoustyugsky District